Captain Phillips is a 2013 American biographical thriller film directed by Paul Greengrass. Based on the 2009 Maersk Alabama hijacking, the film tells the story of the eponymous Captain Richard Phillips, an American merchant mariner who was taken hostage by Somali pirates. It stars Tom Hanks as Phillips, alongside Barkhad Abdi as pirate leader Abduwali Muse.

The screenplay by Billy Ray is based on Phillips's 2010 book A Captain's Duty: Somali Pirates, Navy SEALs, and Dangerous Days at Sea, which Phillips co-wrote with Stephan Talty. Scott Rudin, Dana Brunetti and Michael De Luca served as producers on the project. It premiered at the 2013 New York Film Festival, and was theatrically released on October 11, 2013. The film emerged as a critical and commercial success, receiving positive reviews from critics and grossing $220 million against a budget of $55 million. Captain Phillips received six Academy Award nominations, including Best Picture, Best Adapted Screenplay and Best Supporting Actor for Abdi.

Plot

Richard Phillips takes command of MV Maersk Alabama, an unarmed container vessel from the Port of Salalah in Oman, with orders to sail through the Guardafui Channel to Mombasa, Kenya. Wary of pirate activity off the coast of the Horn of Africa, he and First Officer Shane Murphy order strict security precautions on the vessel and carry out a practice drill. During the drill, the captain notices that the vessel is being followed by Somali pirates in two skiffs, and Phillips calls for help. Knowing that the pirates are listening to radio traffic, he pretends to call a warship, requesting immediate air support. One skiff turns around in response, and the other – crewed by four heavily armed pirates led by Abduwali Muse – loses engine power trying to steer through Maersk Alabamas wake.

The next day, Muse's skiff, now fitted with two outboard engines, returns with the same four pirates aboard. Despite the valiant efforts of Phillips and his crew, the pirates secure their ladder to the ship. As they board, Phillips tells the crew to hide in the engine room, just before the pirates storm the bridge and hold Phillips and the other crew members at gunpoint. Phillips offers Muse the $30,000 in the ship's safe, but Muse's orders are to ransom the ship and crew in exchange for millions of dollars of insurance money from the shipping company. While they search the ship, Shane sees that the youngest pirate Bilal does not have sandals and tells the crew to line the engine room hallway with broken glass. Chief Engineer Mike Perry deactivates the power to the ship, plunging the lower decks into darkness. Bilal cuts his feet when they reach the engine room, and Muse continues to search alone. The crew members ambush Muse, holding him at knifepoint, and arrange to release him and the other pirates into a lifeboat. However, Muse's right-hand man Nour Najee refuses to board the lifeboat with Muse unless Phillips goes with them. Once all are on the lifeboat, Najee attacks Phillips, forcing him into the vessel before launching the boat with all five of them on board.

As the lifeboat heads for Somalia, tensions flare between the pirates as they run low on the plant-based amphetamine khat that they have been eating, and they lose contact with their mother ship. Najee becomes agitated and begins to question Muse’s leadership when they are intercepted by the U.S. Navy destroyer . Bainbridges captain Frank Castellano is ordered to prevent the pirates from reaching the Somali coast by any means. Even when additional ships arrive, Muse asserts that he has come too far and will not surrender. The negotiators are unable to change his mind, and a team from DEVGRU parachutes in to intervene, while Phillips attempts to escape from the lifeboat before being quickly recaptured and repeatedly beaten by Najee.

While three DEVGRU marksmen get into positions, Castellano and DEVGRU continue to try to find a peaceful solution, eventually taking the lifeboat under tow. Muse agrees to board Bainbridge, where he is told that his clan elders are arriving to negotiate Phillips's ransom. In the lifeboat, Phillips prepares a goodbye letter to his wife in case he is killed, while Najee decides to take full control. Najee spots Phillips writing the letter and snatches it. Phillips retaliates by beating Najee until Bilal subdues Phillips by striking him in the back with his AK-47. The pirates tie up and blindfold Phillips and Najee beats Phillips further and berates Bilal and Elmi for their protests, even stating that they've been tricked by the Navy as the elders didn't come to negotiate. As Najee prepares to shoot Phillips, Bainbridges crew stops the tow, causing Elmi, Bilal, and Najee to lose balance. This gives the marksmen three clear shots, by which they simultaneously kill all three pirates. Muse is arrested and taken into custody for piracy. Phillips is rescued from the lifeboat and his injuries are treated. Although in shock and disoriented, he thanks the rescue team for saving his life.

Cast

Maersk Alabama crew and allies 

 Tom Hanks as Richard "Rich" Phillips / "Irish", Captain
 Catherine Keener as Andrea Phillips, Phillips's wife
 Michael Chernus as Shane Murphy, first officer
 David Warshofsky as Mike Perry, chief engineer
 Corey Johnson as Ken Quinn, helmsman
 Chris Mulkey as John Cronan, senior crew member
 Mark Holden as William Rios, boatswain
 Angus MacInnes as Ian Waller, crew member
 Louis Mahoney as Ethan Stoll, crew member
 Vincenzo Nicoli as Andrew, crew member
 Maria Dizzia as Allison McColl
 John Magaro as Dan Phillips
 Gigi Raines as Mariah Phillips
 Riann Steele as Bernetti, US Maritime

Pirates and allies 

 Barkhad Abdi as Abduwali Muse, pirate leader
 Barkhad Abdirahman as Adan Bilal
 Faysal Ahmed as Nour Najee
 Mahat M. Ali as Walid Elmi
 Mohamed Ali as Assad
 Ibrahim Maalim as Hufan
 Idurus Shiish as Idurus
 Azeez Mohammed as Dawoud
 Nasir Jamas as Eko

US Navy and allies 

 Yul Vazquez as Commander Frank Castellano, commanding officer, USS Bainbridge
 Max Martini as DEVGRU commander
 Omar Berdouni as Nemo, Somali-language translator working for the U.S. Navy as part of Mission Essential
 Hospital Corpsman Second Class Danielle Albert as Chief Hospital Corpsman O'Brien
 Fire Control Technician First Class (SW) Nathan Cobler as Hospital Corpsman First Class Cobler

Production

Development

Sony Pictures optioned the film rights shortly after the publication of Richard Phillips's memoir A Captain's Duty in 2010. In March 2011, actor Tom Hanks attached himself to the project after reading a draft of the screenplay by Billy Ray. Director Paul Greengrass was offered the helm of the untitled film adaptation during the following June. A worldwide search subsequently began to find the film's supporting Somali cast. From this search, Barkhad Abdi, Barkhad Abdirahman, Faysal Ahmed, and Mahat M. Ali were chosen from among more than 700 participants at a 2011 casting call at the Brian Coyle Community Center in Cedar-Riverside, Minneapolis. The four actors were selected, according to search casting director Debbie DeLisi, because they were "the chosen ones, that anointed group that stuck out."

Producers visited the National Navy UDT-SEAL Museum to see the bullet-scarred, five-ton fiberglass lifeboat aboard which the pirates held Capt. Phillips hostage so that they could accurately re-create the boat and interiors for the set. They were also able to view an example of the Boeing Insitu ScanEagle UAV used to monitor the crisis, as well as the Mark 11 Mod 0 (SR-25) sniper rifle (the type used by the U.S. Navy SEALs), both also on display at the museum.

Filming
Principal photography for Captain Phillips began on March 26, 2012. Filming took place off the coast of Malta in the Mediterranean Sea. Nine weeks were spent filming aboard Alexander Maersk, a container ship identical to Maersk Alabama. The container vessel was chartered on commercial terms with Maersk Line.

Music
The film score to Captain Phillips was composed by Henry Jackman. A soundtrack album for the film was released in physical forms on October 15, 2013 by Varèse Sarabande. Additional songs featured in the film include:
 "Up in Here" by KOVAS
 "Hilm B Hilm" by Musa Hanhan
 "Wonderful Tonight" by Eric Clapton
 "The End" by John Powell, a track from Greengrass's 2006 film United 93

Release

Theatrical
Captain Phillips premiered on September 20, 2013, opening the 2013 New York Film Festival. The film was praised for its direction, screenplay, production values, cinematography, and the performances of Tom Hanks and Barkhad Abdi.

Home media
Captain Phillips was released on Blu-ray Disc and DVD on January 21, 2014.

Reception

Box office
Captain Phillips grossed $107.1 million in North America and $111.7 million in other countries for a worldwide total of $218.8 million, against its budget of $55 million.

In the United States, the film grossed $25.7 million in its opening weekend, finishing second place at the box office behind Gravity ($43.2 million). It made $16.4 million in its second weekend, remaining in second.

The film was unable to secure a release in China, which caused Sony Pictures to be concerned about the profitability of the film.
Based on information revealed in the Sony Pictures hack, the film made a net profit of $39 million, when factoring together all expenses and revenues.

Critical response
On Rotten Tomatoes, the film has an approval rating of 93% based on 282 reviews, with an average rating of 8.3/10. The website's critical consensus reads, "Smart, powerfully acted, and incredibly intense, Captain Phillips offers filmgoers a Hollywood biopic done right — and offers Tom Hanks a showcase for yet another brilliant performance." On Metacritic, the film has a weighted average score of 83 out of 100, based on 48 critics, indicating "universal acclaim". Audiences polled by CinemaScore gave the film an average grade of "A" on an A+ to F scale.

The film was nominated for four Golden Globe Awards, including Best Picture (Drama), Best Actor in a Drama (Hanks), Best Supporting Actor (Abdi) and Best Director (Greengrass). It did not win in any of the categories. The film was also nominated for nine British Academy Film Awards, including Best Film, Best Direction (Greengrass), Best Actor (Hanks), Best Supporting Actor (Abdi), and Best Adapted Screenplay. Abdi won the film's only award for Best Supporting Actor. The film was also nominated for six Academy Awards - Best Picture, Best Supporting Actor (Abdi), Best Adapted Screenplay, Best Film Editing, Best Sound Mixing, and Best Sound Editing. - though it did not win any of the categories.

Film critic Top Ten lists
Various American critics have named the film as one of the best of 2013.

 1st – Kenneth Turan, Los Angeles Times
 2nd – Empire
 3rd – Lou Lumenick, New York Post
 3rd – Roger Moore, Movie Nation
 4th – Rafer Guzmán, Newsday
 4th – Anne Thompson, Indiewire
 5th – Christopher Orr, The Atlantic
 5th – Chris Nastawaty, Entertainment Weekly
 5th – Kyle Smith, New York Post
 5th – Matt Singer, The Dissolve
 5th – Christopher Rosen & Mike Ryan, Huffington Post
 6th – Richard Roeper, Chicago Sun-Times
 6th – Mara Reinstein, Us Weekly
 6th – Randy Myers, San Jose Mercury News
 6th – Mick LaSalle, San Francisco Chronicle
 7th – Richard Lawson, Vanity Fair
 7th – Peter Travers, Rolling Stone
 7th – Joe Neumaier, New York Daily News
 8th – Sasha Stone, Awards Daily
 8th – Lisa Kennedy, Denver Post
 8th – Barbara Vancheri, Pittsburgh Post-Gazette
 9th – Genevieve Koski, The Dissolve
 9th – Mike Scott, The Times-Picayune
 9th – James Berardinelli, Reelviews
 Best of 2013 (listed alphabetically, not ranked) – David Denby, The New Yorker
 Best of 2013 (listed alphabetically, not ranked) – Manohla Dargis, The New York Times

Accolades

{| class="wikitable" width=
! colspan="5" style="background: LightSteelBlue;" | Awards
|- 
! Award
! Category
! Recipient(s)
! Result
! 
|-
| rowspan="3"| AACTA International Awards
| Best Film
| Captain Phillips
| 
| rowspan=3| 
|-
| Best Direction
| Paul Greengrass
| 
|-
| Best Actor
| Tom Hanks
| 
|-
| rowspan="6"| Academy Awards
| Best Picture
| Scott Rudin, Dana Brunetti and Michael De Luca
| 
| rowspan=6| 
|-
| Best Supporting Actor
| Barkhad Abdi
| 
|-
| Best Adapted Screenplay
| Billy Ray
| 
|-
| Best Film Editing
| Christopher Rouse
| 
|-
| Best Sound Editing
| Oliver Tarney
| 
|-
| Best Sound Mixing
| Chris Burdon, Mark Taylor, Mike Prestwood Smith and Chris Munro
| 
|-
| rowspan="3"| Alliance of Women Film Journalists
| Best Actor in a Supporting Role
| Barkhad Abdi
| 
| rowspan="3"|
|-
| Best Screenplay, Adapted
| Billy Ray
| 
|-
| Best Editing
| Christopher Rouse
| 
|-
| American Cinema Editors
| Best Edited Feature Film – Dramatic
| Christopher Rouse
| 
| 
|-
| American Film Institute
| Top Ten Films of the Year
| Captain Phillips
| 
| 
|-
| American Society of Cinematographers
| Outstanding Achievement in Cinematography in Theatrical Releases
| Barry Ackroyd
| 
|
|-
| Art Directors Guild
| Excellence in Production Design – Contemporary Film
| Paul Kirby
| 
| 
|-
| rowspan="2"| Black Reel Awards
| Best Supporting Actor
| Barkhad Abdi
| 
| rowspan=2| <ref>{{cite web|url=http://blackreelawards.wordpress.com/2014/02/14/12-years-a-slave-breaks-free/|title=12 Years a Slave" Breaks Free|publisher=Black Reel Awards|date=February 13, 2014|access-date=February 14, 2014}}</ref>
|-
| Best Breakthrough Performance – Male
| Barkhad Abdi
| 
|-
| rowspan="9"| British Academy Film Awards
| Best Film
| Captain Phillips| 
| rowspan=9| 
|-
| Best Director
| Paul Greengrass
| 
|-
| Best Actor in a Leading Role
| Tom Hanks
| 
|-
| Best Actor in a Supporting Role
| Barkhad Abdi
| 
|-
| Best Adapted Screenplay
| Billy Ray
| 
|-
| Best Cinematography
| Barry Ackroyd
| 
|-
| Best Original Music
| Henry Jackman
| 
|-
| Best Editing
| Christopher Rouse
| 
|-
| Best Sound
| Captain Phillips| 
|-
| Casting Society of America
| Big Budget Drama
| Francine Maisler and Donna M. Belajac
| 
| 
|-
| rowspan="2"| Chicago Film Critics Association
| Best Supporting Actor
| Barkhad Abdi
| 
| rowspan=2| 
|-
| Most Promising Performer
| Barkhad Abdi
| 
|-
| Cinema Audio Society
| Outstanding Achievement in Sound Mixing – Motion Picture – Live Action
| Chris Munro, Mike Prestwood Smith, Chris Burdon, Mark Taylor, Al Clay, Howard London and Glen Gathard
| 
| 
|-
| rowspan="3"| Detroit Film Critics Society
| Best Director
| Paul Greengrass
| 
| rowspan=3| 
|-
| Best Actor
| Tom Hanks
| 
|-
| Best Supporting Actor
| Barkhad Abdi
| 
|-
| Directors Guild of America Awards
| Outstanding Direction – Feature Film
| Paul Greengrass
| 
| 
|-
| rowspan="5"| Empire Awards
| Best Film
| Captain Phillips| 
| rowspan=5| 
|-
| Best Thriller
| Captain Phillips| 
|-
| Best Actor
| Tom Hanks
| 
|-
| Best Director
| Paul Greengrass
| 
|-
| Best Male Newcomer
| Barkhad Abdi
| 
|-
| rowspan="4"| Golden Globe Awards
| Best Motion Picture – Drama
| Captain Phillips| 
| rowspan=4| 
|-
| Best Actor – Motion Picture Drama
| Tom Hanks
| 
|-
| Best Supporting Actor – Motion Picture
| Barkhad Abdi
| 
|-
| Best Director
| Paul Greengrass
| 
|-
| rowspan="3"| London Film Critics Circle
| Actor of the Year
| Tom Hanks
| 
| rowspan=3| 
|-
| Supporting Actor of the Year
| Barkhad Abdi
| 
|-
| Director of the Year
| Paul Greengrass
| 
|-
| rowspan="2"| Motion Picture Sound Editors
| Best Sound Editing: Sound Effects & Foley in a Feature Film
| Oliver Tarney
| 
| rowspan=2| 
|-
| Best Sound Editing: Dialogue & ADR in a Feature Film
| Oliver Tarney
| 
|-
| rowspan="2"| Online Film Critics Society
| Best Actor
| Tom Hanks
| 
| rowspan=2| 
|-
| Best Supporting Actor
| Barkhad Abdi
| 
|-
| People's Choice Awards
| Favorite Dramatic Movie
| Captain Phillips| 
| 
|-
| Producers Guild of America Awards
| Best Theatrical Motion Picture
| Captain Phillips| 
| 
|-
| rowspan="3"| San Diego Film Critics Society
| Best Actor
| Tom Hanks
| 
| rowspan=3| 
|-
| Best Adapted Screenplay
| Billy Ray
| 
|-
| Best Editing
| Christopher Rouse
| 
|-
| rowspan="2"| San Francisco Film Critics Circle
| Best Supporting Actor
| Barkhad Abdi
| 
| rowspan="2"|
|-
| Best Editing
| Christopher Rouse
| 
|-
| rowspan="5"| Satellite Awards
| Best Film
| Captain Phillips| 
| rowspan=5| 
|-
| Best Director
| Paul Greengrass
| 
|-
| Best Actor – Motion Picture
| Tom Hanks
| 
|-
| Best Adapted Screenplay
| Billy Ray
| 
|-
| Best Sound
| Captain Phillips| 
|-
| rowspan="2"| Screen Actors Guild Awards
| Outstanding Performance by a Male Actor in a Leading Role
| Tom Hanks
| 
| rowspan=2| 
|-
| Outstanding Performance by a Male Actor in a Supporting Role
| Barkhad Abdi
| 
|-
| rowspan="3"| St. Louis Gateway Film Critics Association
| Best Supporting Actor
| Barkhad Abdi
| 
| rowspan=3| 
|-
| Best Adapted Screenplay
| Billy Ray
| 
|-
| Best Scene
| The scene near the end of the film when Phillips is being checked out by military medical personnel and breaks down.
| 
|-
| USC Scripter Award
| USC Libraries Scripter Award
| Richard Philips, Stephan Talty and Billy Ray
| 
| 
|-
| Washington D.C. Area Film Critics Association
| Best Adapted Screenplay
| Billy Ray
| 
| 
|}

Historical accuracy

In a New York Post article, some of the crew members of the Maersk Alabama accused the film of being inaccurate in facts and the portrayal of Phillips, claiming that Phillips was not as heroic as the film depicts him. Mike Perry, the chief engineer of the Maersk Alabama, also asserted in a CNN interview that the film does not tell the true story.

The film's director Paul Greengrass publicly stated that he "stands behind the authenticity of Captain Phillips", despite complaints of inaccuracy with how the film portrays the events surrounding the hijacking, and "at the end of the day, it is easy to make anonymous accusations against a film. But the facts are clear. Captain Phillips's ship was attacked, and the ship and the crew and its cargo made it safely to port with no injuries or loss of life. That's the story we told, and it's an accurate one." Phillips's first mate Shane Murphy stated in an interview with Vulture published on October 13, 2013 that he was satisfied with how the movie portrayed both Phillips and himself, and stated that he was only disappointed that the film didn't show footage of the crews' families at home or the President's comments on the hijacking.

The visual blog Information is Beautiful estimated that, while taking creative license into account, the film was 81.4% accurate when compared to real-life events and called it "pretty accurate".

See also
 A Hijacking Pirates of the 20th Century''
 Survival film
 List of films featuring the United States Navy SEALs
 List of films featuring drones

References

Informational notes

Citations

External links

 
 
 
 
 

2013 films
2010s action thriller films
2013 biographical drama films
2013 thriller drama films
American action thriller films
American biographical films
American thriller drama films
BAFTA winners (films)
Columbia Pictures films
American docudrama films
Action films based on actual events
Drama films based on actual events
Somali-language films
Films scored by Henry Jackman
Films about ship hijackings
Films based on non-fiction books
Films directed by Paul Greengrass
Films produced by Michael De Luca
Films produced by Scott Rudin
Films set in 2009
Films set in the Indian Ocean
Films set in Oman
Films set in Somalia
Films set in Vermont
Films set in Kenya
Films shot in Malta
Films shot in Massachusetts
Films shot in Morocco
Films shot in Virginia
Films about hostage takings
IMAX films
Piracy in Somalia
Pirate films
Films with screenplays by Billy Ray
Seafaring films based on actual events
Thriller films based on actual events
Films about United States Navy SEALs
2010s survival films
2013 drama films
Films set on ships
2010s English-language films
2010s American films